Ibrahim Adil Shah II (1570 – 12 September 1627) was king of the Sultanate of Bijapur and a member of the Adil Shahi dynasty. Under his reign the dynasty had its greatest period as he extended its frontier as far south as Mysore. He was a skilful administrator, artist, poet and a generous patron of the arts. He reverted to the Sunni sect of Islam, but remained tolerant of other religions, including Christianity. However, during his reign high-ranking Shiite immigrants became unwelcome and in 1590, he ordered the confinement of criers who read the khutba in the Shia form. After his reign, increasing weakness permitted Mughal encroachment and the successful revolt of the Maratha king Shivaji, who killed the Bijapur general Afzal Khan and scattered his army. The dynasty left a tradition of cosmopolitan culture and artistic patronage whose architectural remains are to be seen in the capital city of Bijapur.

Early life 

Ibrahim Adil Shah (the father of Ali Adil Shah I) had divided power between the Sunni nobles, the Habshis and the Deccanis. However, Ali Adil Shah favoured the Shi'i.

Monarchy 

After the death of Ali Adil Shah I in 1580, the kingdom's nobles appointed Imran Ibrahim, son of Imran Sayzada Tahmash Adil Shah and nephew of Ali Adil Shah I, as king. At this time, Ibrahim Adil Shah II was a nine-year-old boy.

Siege 

Kamal Khan (a Deccani general) seized power and became the regent. Kamal Khan showed disrespect to the Dowager queen Chand Bibi, who felt that he had ambitions to usurp the throne. Chand Bibi plotted an attack against Kamal Khan, with help from another general, Haji Kishvar Khan. Kamal Khan was captured while fleeing and was beheaded at the fort.

The Regents 

Kishvar Khan was the second regent of Ibrahim. He defeated the Ahmadnagar Sultanate at Dharaseo, capturing all the artillery and elephants of the enemy army. He ordered other Bijapur generals to surrender the highly valued elephants that they had captured. The generals, along with Chand Bibi, hatched a plan to eliminate Kishvar Khan with help from General Mustafa Khan of Bankapur. Kishvar Khan's spies informed him of the conspiracy. Kishvar Khan sent troops against Mustafa Khan, who was captured and killed in the battle.

De facto rulers 

Chand Bibi challenged Kishvar Khan, who had her imprisoned at the Satara fort and tried to declare himself the king. However, Kishvar Khan was already unpopular among the rest of the generals. He was forced to flee when a joint army, led by General Ikhlas Khan, marched to Bijapur. The army consisted of forces of three Habshi nobles: Ikhlas Khan, Hamid Khan and Dilavar Khan. Kishvar Khan attacked Ahmednagar unsuccessfully and then fled to Golconda. He was killed in exile by a relative of Mustafa Khan. Chand Bibi was then declared the regent.

Ikhlas Khan became regent for a short time, but he was dismissed by Chand Bibi shortly afterwards. Later, he resumed his dictatorship, which was soon challenged by other Habshi generals.

Attack on Bijapur 

Taking advantage of the situation in Bijapur, Ahmadnagar's Nizam Shahi sultan allied with the Qutb Shahi of Golconda to attack Bijapur. The troops available at Bijapur were not sufficient to repulse the joint attack. The Habshi generals realised that they could not defend the city alone and tendered their resignations to Chand Bibi. Abu-ul-Hassan, a Shi'a general appointed by Chand Bibi, called for the Maratha forces in Carnatic. The Marathas attacked the invaders' supply lines, forcing the Ahmednagar-Golconda allied army to retreat.

Ikhlas Khan then attacked Dilavar Khan to seize control of Bijapur. However, he was defeated and Dilavar Khan became the supreme ruler from 1582 to 1591. He was the last regent of Ibrahim.

Ibrahim Adil Shah's reign 

The fifth king of the Adil Shahi dynasty is known in Indian history as Jagadguru Badshah. He loved music and played musical instruments. For him, the Tanpura personified learning – "Ibrahim the tanpurawala became learned due to grace of god, living in the city of Vidyanagari" (Vidyanagari is the earlier name of Bijapur.) He composed poems on his wife Chand Sultana, his Tanpura Motikhan and his elephant Atish Khan.

Ibrahim II publicly declared that all he wanted was Vidya or learning, music, and Guruseva (serving the teacher). He was a devotee of Banda Nawaj, the Sufi saint of Gulbarga. He composed a prayer to him to bestow Vidya or learning and charitable disposition.

He founded a new township at Navraspur to give concrete shape to his idea of a musical city. He had a temple built inside the precincts of the palace that still exists.

Bijapur attracted the period's best musicians and dancers because the king was famous as a great connoisseur and patron of music.

He spoke Marathi, Dakhani, Urdu and Kannada languages fluently, and like his predecessors, employed several Hindus in top posts.

Issue

By Chand Sultana:
Darvesh Badshah

By Kamal Khatun:
Sultan Sulaiman

By Taj Sultan:
Muhammad Adil Shah

By Sundar Mahal:
Khizr Shah

By unknown mothers:
Burhan
Zuhra Sultan
Sultan Begum(wife of Daniyal Mirza son of Akbar)
Fatima Sultana(wife of Sayyid Shah Habibullah ibn  Yadullah Hussaini)

Kitab-e-Navras 

Ibrahim II wrote the book Kitab-e-Navras (Book of Nine Rasas) in Dakhani. It is a collection of 59 poems and 17 couplets. According to his court-poet Muhammad Zuhuri, he wrote it to introduce the theory of nine Rasas, which occupies an important place in Indian aesthetics, to acquaint people who knew only the Persian ethos. The book opens with a prayer to Sarasvati, the Goddess of learning.

bhaka nyari nyari bhava ek
kaha turuk kaha barahaman

"Whether a Turk (Muslim) or a Brahmin with different language—emotion is the same."

nouras soor juga joti ani saroguni
yusat sarasuti mata
ibrahim parasada bhayi dooni

"Oh mother Saraswati! Since you have blessed Ibrahim, his work Navras will last for long"

References

Further reading 

 A Visit to Bijapur by H. S. Kaujalagi
 "Avalokana" a souvenir published by the Government of Karnataka
 Centenary souvenir published by the Bijapur Municipal Corporation

External links 

16th-century births
1627 deaths
Adil Shahi dynasty
1627 in India
1580 in India
17th-century Indian Muslims
16th-century Indian monarchs
17th-century Indian monarchs
Sultans of Bijapur
Converts to Sunni Islam from Shia Islam